Dr. Laurie Edward Evans  (October 14, 1933 – June 19, 2016) was a politician in Manitoba, Canada. Between 1988 and 1990, he served as a member of the Legislative Assembly of Manitoba, representing the riding of Fort Garry for the Manitoba Liberal Party.

Born in Unity, Saskatchewan, Evans had a Bachelor of Science degree from the University of Saskatchewan, and Master of Science and Ph.D. degrees from the University of Manitoba. He worked as an agriculturalist before entering public life, and joined the Academic Staff of the University of Manitoba in 1958. From 1968 to 1969, he was a technical advisor to the Canadian International Development Agency (CIDA) in Kenya. He was married to Mary Ellen Evans. He had three daughters from a previous marriage, Laura, Norma and Nancy, and two stepsons Joseph and John.

Political career
Evans first ran for the provincial legislature in the provincial election of 1986, in the rural riding of Springfield (located just outside Winnipeg). He received 1,376 votes, finishing well behind incumbent New Democrat Andy Anstett and the winner, Progressive Conservative Gilles Roch.

Two years later, he was elected in the south-central Winnipeg riding of Fort Garry (which included the University of Manitoba's main campus at the time), defeating incumbent Progressive Conservative Charlie Birt by almost 1,000 votes. The Liberals increased their parliamentary representation from one to twenty in this election, and Evans sat with the official opposition for the next two years. In the provincial election of 1990, he lost to Progressive Conservative Rosemary Vodrey amid a general loss of support for the Liberal Party.

In 2002 Evans was elected Councillor for Ward 6 in the Rural Municipality of Ste. Anne, Manitoba, serving in this position until he resigned in 2015 to move back to Winnipeg.

Election results

References

1933 births
2016 deaths
Manitoba Liberal Party MLAs
University of Saskatchewan alumni
People from Unity, Saskatchewan